Zande is the largest of the Zande languages. It is spoken by the Azande, primarily in the northeast of the Democratic Republic of the Congo and western South Sudan, but also in the eastern part of the Central African Republic. It is called Pazande in the Zande language and Kizande in Lingala.

Estimates about the number of speakers vary; in 2001 Koen Impens cited studies that put the number between 700,000 and one million.

Phonology

Consonants 

 Alveolar sounds /d, z, ⁿz, s, t, ⁿd/ have allophones as palato-alveolar sounds [d͡ʒ, ʒ, ⁿʒ, ʃ, t͡ʃ, ⁿd͡ʒ] when preceding /i/.
 The retroflex tap /ɽ/ can be heard as an alveolar trill [r] in free variation.

Vowels

Writing system 
Sample text in Zande

Avunguagudee, oni nangarasa rukutu awironi na gu sosono yo i mangi agu asunge dunduko na ngbarago i afuhe fuyo i mangihe, singia si tii Bambu Kindo yo, watadu ba bakere adunguratise yo?

Translation

Parents, do you encourage your children and teenagers to work cheerfully at any assignment that they are given to do, whether at the Kingdom Hall, at an assembly, or at a convention site?

Zande spelling rules were established at the 1928 Rejaf Language Conference following the principles of the International African Institute.

Nasalized vowels are indicated using the tilde : .
Consonants with double articulation are represented by digraphs: .

In 1959, Archibald Norman Tucker published a Zande alphabet proposed during the Bangenzi Conference of 1941.

Nasalized vowels are indicated using the tilde : ã ẽ ĩ ĩ̧ õ ũ ũ̧ r̃.
Consonants with double articulation are represented by digraphs or trigraphs : kp gb ny mb nv nd nz ng ngb mgb

SIL International published a Zande alphabet in 2014.

References

Bibliography

External links
PanAfrican L10n page on Zande

Languages of the Central African Republic
Languages of the Democratic Republic of the Congo
Languages of South Sudan
Zande languages
language